"The Cossack Lullaby" is a cradle song that Russian writer Mikhail Lermontov wrote in 1838 during his exile in Caucasus.

Background
In 1837, Alexandr Pushkin had a duel with Georges d'Anthes and two days later died. Mikhail Lermontov, who had adored Pushkin, wrote a poem entitled the Death of the Poet and lamented that he fell as a victim of the aristocracy surrounding the Czar. He was immediately exiled to the Caucasus.

While in Caucasus, he heard an old Terek Cossack woman sing a cradle song, which he transcribed as the Cossack Lullaby. At that time, the Terek Cossacks defended Russia's southern border against the Ingush and Chechens. Lermontov is said to have actually put the song in music in Voronezh on his way to Saint Petersburg. The song was later sent to Saint Petersburg and Moscow and became popular.

Words and translation
The song has six stanzas, of which two are described below with a direct English translation.

See also
 Mikhail Lermontov's first exile
 Osetia

References

Russian-language songs
Russian songs
Russian children's songs
Mikhail Lermontov
Ossetia
Lullabies